Tate-a-Tate is an album by saxophonist Buddy Tate with trumpeter/flugelhornist Clark Terry which was recorded in 1960 and released on the Swingville label.

Reception

Scott Yanow of AllMusic states, "The music is enjoyable and practically defines mainstream jazz of the era".

Track listing
All compositions by Clark Terry except where noted
 "Groun' Hog" – 8:10
 "Tate-a-Tate" – 4:09
 "Snatchin' It Back" – 5:37
 "#20 Ladbroke Square" (Buddy Tate, Esmond Edwards) – 6:20
 "All Too Soon" (Duke Ellington, Carl Sigman) – 4:11
 "Take the "A" Train" (Billy Strayhorn) – 7:02

Personnel
Buddy Tate – tenor saxophone
Clark Terry – trumpet, flugelhorn
Tommy Flanagan – piano
Larry Gales – bass
Art Taylor – drums

References

Buddy Tate albums
Clark Terry albums
1960 albums
Swingville Records albums
Albums recorded at Van Gelder Studio
Albums produced by Esmond Edwards